The West House is a family restaurant located in Biddenden, Kent, England. , the restaurant holds one star in the Michelin Guide.

See also
 List of Michelin starred restaurants

References

External links
 www.thewesthouserestaurant.co.uk - Official website

Restaurants in Kent
Michelin Guide starred restaurants in the United Kingdom